The Juno Cup is a yearly ice hockey game held in conjunction with the Juno Awards, first conducted at the 2004 Juno Awards. The games match National Hockey League alumni with artists and entertainers as a charitable benefit for MusiCounts, a music education charity operated by the CARAS. The Juno Cup has helped raise more than $700,000 for MusiCounts (formerly known as the CARAS Music Education Program) which in turn supported music programs across Canada.

Each game features a team of current or former NHL players (NHL Greats) who competes against a team composed of musicians (The Rockers). The NHL Greats have won each Juno Cup except in 2009 and 2019.

Dates and locations

References

External links
Official Juno Cup Website

 

Ice hockey tournaments in Canada